Filatima saliciphaga is a moth of the family Gelechiidae. It is found in North America, where it has been recorded from California.

The wingspan is 18–21 mm. The forewings are tan to whitish tan, the scales tipped ochreous brown to fuscous, producing a light irroration. The wing has ill-defined markings and usually a black mark along the dorsal base. There are remnants of a dark streak through the center of wing. The plical stigma is not distinguishable and the first discal stigma has the form of a black dot at beyond one-third, the second discal at nearly two-thirds. There is sometimes an oblique dark area toward the tornus. The hindwings are white, lightly infuscated.

The larvae feed on Salix sessilifolia.

References

Moths described in 1937
Filatima